Neijiang North railway station (Chinese: 内江北站) is a railway station in Dongxing District, Neijiang, Sichuan, China. It is one of three operational railway stations in Neijiang and the first to be served by high-speed services. 

Neijiang railway station is served by conventional trains on the Chengdu–Chongqing railway and the Neijiang–Kunming railway.

History
Neijiang North railway station opened on 26 December 2015. In its first year of operation there were 2.21 million passengers.

References

Railway stations in Sichuan
Railway stations in China opened in 2015
Stations on the Chengdu–Chongqing Intercity Railway